Dylan John Pieterse (born 28 January 1995) is a South African rugby union player for the  in the Currie Cup. His regular position is lock or flanker.

Early life 

Pieterse was born in Kempton Park and attended King Edward VII School in Johannesburg.

He played first team rugby for KES in 2012 and 2013, but did not earn any further provincial callups.

2014–2015 : Pumas / Witbank Ferros

Pieterse spent some time training at the Blue Bulls academy, before joining the Nelspruit-based  for the 2014 Under-19 Provincial Championship. He made seven appearances for the  team in Group B of the competition, scoring seven tries, the most by a Pumas player in the competition. Further tries against  and  followed as he helped the Pumas to finish in fourth spot on the log.

At the start of 2015, Pieterse played amateur club rugby, making four appearances for the Witbank Ferros during the Community Cup competition. The team failed to qualify from Pool D, winning just one of their four matches.

He rejoined the Pumas in the second half of the year, starting five matches for the  side during the Under-21 Provincial Championship. The team did not take part in the title play-offs, however, since they were deducted all their log points after fielding ineligible players during the competition.

2016: Western Force / Cottesloe

Pieterse moved to Australia to join the Perth-based Western Force's Future Force program, also playing club rugby for Cottesloe in the Premier Grade, the premier league in Western Australia. He made sixteen appearances in the competitions, and scored four tries – a brace against Wanneroo was followed by one try against Associates in his next match and another against UWA later in the competition. He helped the team reach the semi-finals of the competition, where they lost to Wests Scarborough.

2016: Eastern Province Kings

He returned to South Africa to join the  prior to the 2016 Currie Cup.

References

1995 births
Living people
Austin Gilgronis players
Eastern Province Elephants players
Expatriate rugby union players in the United States
People from Kempton Park, Gauteng
Rugby union locks
Rugby union flankers
South African expatriate rugby union players
South African expatriate sportspeople in the United States
Rugby union players from Gauteng